Candoia paulsoni, also known as the Solomon Islands ground boa, is a species of boa native to the Maluku Islands and Melanesia. Five subspecies are recognized.

Subspecies
 C. p. paulsoni (Stull, 1956) – the Solomon Islands
 C. p. vindumi Smith & Chiszar, 2001 – Bougainville Island
 C. p. tasmai Smith & Tepedelen 2001 – Halmahera and the Talaud Islands
 C. p. mcdowelli Smith & Chiszar, 2001 – eastern Papua New Guinea
 C. p. sadlieri Smith & Chiszar, 2001 – Woodlark Island
 C. p. rosadoi Smith & Chiszar, 2001 – Misima Island

Distribution
The type locality is Ugi Island in the Solomon Islands.

Etymology
The specific name paulsoni is in honor of the Swedish herpetologist John Paulson.

References

 
paulsoni
Snakes of New Guinea
Reptiles of Papua New Guinea
Reptiles of the Solomon Islands
Reptiles of Indonesia
Taxa named by Olive Griffith Stull
Reptiles described in 1956